WTUG-FM (92.9 MHz) is a radio station serving the Tuscaloosa, Alabama, vicinity with an urban adult contemporary format. Licensed to Northport, Alabama, United States. The station is currently owned by Townsquare Media.

In February 2005, Apex Broadcasting Inc. (Houston L. Pearce, chairman) reached an agreement to sell WTUG-FM and six other radio stations in Alabama to Citadel Broadcasting (Farid Suleman, chairman/CEO) for a reported sale price of $29 million. Citadel merged with Cumulus Media on September 16, 2011.

Cumulus sold WTUG-FM and its sister stations to Townsquare Media on July 31, 2012.

WTUG-FM provides regular weather coverage from WBMA-LD chief meteorologist James Spann. During times of active severe, tropical, and Winter weather events, WTUG-FM provides West Alabama's only live and local weather coverage on the radio, with local, in-house, Staff Meteorologist Bobby Best.

Additionally, under the ownership of Townsquare Media and the direction of Market President/Chief Revenue Officer David R. Dubose, WTUG-FM also provides West Alabama radio's only live and local news coverage with News Director Don Hartley and West Alabama's only live and local traffic coverage with Traffic Reporter Capt'n Ray.

On December 20, 2017, WTUG-FM's HD3 subchannel flipped from adult album alternative as "Birmingham Mountain Radio" to classic hits as "Nick 97.5", named for University of Alabama coach Nick Saban, with the first song being "Sweet Home Alabama" by Lynyrd Skynyrd. On January 24, 2022, the HD3 subchannel flipped to soft oldies as "97.5 MeTV-FM".

Translators

References

External links
WTUG 92.9 FM official website

TUG-FM
Urban adult contemporary radio stations in the United States
Radio stations established in 1979
1979 establishments in Alabama
Townsquare Media radio stations